Alula Aba Nega Airport , also known as Mekelle Airport, is an airport serving Mekelle, the capital city of the Tigray Region in northern Ethiopia.

History 
The airport was named after the famous Ethiopian military leader Ras Alula, also known as Alula Aba Nega (Nega was his favorite horse, following the custom of using "Abba" plus attaching the horse's name to that of a well-known warrior's first name). He is well known for his battles against Italy, the Ottoman Turks, Egypt and the Battle of Adwa.

Facilities 

Airlines and destinations

Incidents 
On 22 August 1982, Douglas DC-3 ET-AHP of Ethiopian Airlines was damaged beyond repair in a take-off accident.

References

External links 
 

Airports in Ethiopia
Mekelle